is a species of derbid planthopper in the family .

References

Further reading

External links

 

Derbinae
Insects described in 1922